Nimal Senarath Wijesinghe (born 15 December 1969) is a Sri Lankan politician and member of the Parliament of Sri Lanka. He belongs to the United National Party.

References

Members of the 14th Parliament of Sri Lanka
United National Party politicians
Living people
1969 births